The 1960 Clemson Tigers football team was an American football team that represented Clemson University in the Atlantic Coast Conference (ACC) during the 1960 NCAA University Division football season. In its 21st season under head coach Frank Howard, the team compiled a 6–4 record (4–2 against conference opponents), finished fourth in the ACC, and outscored opponents by a total of 197 to 124. The team played its home games at Memorial Stadium in Clemson, South Carolina.

Dave Lynn and Lowndes Shingler were the team captains. The team's statistical leaders included Lowndes Shingler with 790 passing yards, Bill McGuirt with 320 rushing yards and 54 points scored (9 touchdowns), and Harry Pavilack with 272 receiving yards.

Schedule

References

Clemson
Clemson Tigers football seasons
Clemson Tigers football